Fibrolase (fibrinolytic proteinase, Agkistrodon contortrix contortrix metalloproteinase, Agkistrodon contortrix contortrix venom metalloproteinase) is an enzyme. This enzyme catalyses the following chemical reaction

 Hydrolysis of -Ala14-Leu- in insulin B chain and -Lys413-Leu- in alpha-chain of fibrinogen

This enzyme is present in the venom of the southern copperhead snake (Agkistrodon contortrix contortrix).

References

External links 
 

EC 3.4.24